The 2021–22 ISU Challenger Series was held from September to December 2021. It was the eighth season that the ISU Challenger Series, a group of senior-level international figure skating competitions ranked below the ISU Grand Prix, was held.

Events 
The 2021–22 Challenger Series was composed of eight events. The previously announced final Olympic qualifier (Nebelhorn Trophy) was included in the schedule.

Cancelled

Lost status 

In the 2021 Asian Trophy, only men's singles and women's singles had international participants, and the total number of ISU member countries represented in the event was 9. These conditions do not satisfy the requirement to be a Challenger Series event.

Requirements 
Skaters were eligible to compete on the Challenger Series if they had reached the age of 15 before July 1, 2021.

Medal summary

Medalists

Men

Women

Pairs

Ice dance

Medal standings

Challenger Series rankings 
The ISU Challenger Series rankings were formed by combining the two highest final scores of each skater/team.

Men 
.

Women 
.

Pairs 
.

Ice dance 
.

Top scores

Men

Best total score

Best short program score

Best free skating score

Women

Best total score

Best short program score

Best free skating score

Pairs

Best total score

Best short program score

Best free skating score

Ice dance

Best total score

Best rhythm dance score

Best free dance score

Notes

References

External links 
 ISU Challenger Series at the International Skating Union

ISU Challenger Series
Figure skating competitions
Challenger Series